Childs Residence, also known as the George Miller Residence and Millersville Store and Post Office, is a historic home and associated buildings at Millersville, Anne Arundel County, Maryland.  The home is a c. 1840 -story frame dwelling with a large 2-story frame addition built about 1852.  Also on the property are a frame smokehouse/dairy built about 1840, and a c. 1920 frame store.  It served as the dwelling of the first Postmaster in Millersville, and is noteworthy for having continuously served as the Post Office and community store for 130 years.  It is now home to the Anne Arundel County Trails program.

It was listed on the National Register of Historic Places in 1986.

References

External links
, including photo from 1985, at Maryland Historical Trust

Houses on the National Register of Historic Places in Maryland
Houses in Anne Arundel County, Maryland
Houses completed in 1840
National Register of Historic Places in Anne Arundel County, Maryland